The 1st/15th Royal New South Wales Lancers is an active Australian Army Reserve Cavalry regiment. The regiment has its headquarters at Lancer Barracks in Parramatta, a suburb in Western Sydney, New South Wales. Lancer Barracks is the oldest Military Barracks on mainland Australia and dates from 1819.

History
The regiment dates back to the formation of the Sydney Light Horse Volunteers in January 1885 and took its current name in 1956 when the 1st Royal New South Wales Lancers and the 15th Northern River Lancers amalgamated, initially being equipped with Matilda tanks. The 1st/15th RNSWL carries the former regiments' battle honours, and consequently has 31 collective battle honours, including those from the Boer War, First World War and Second World War.

The regiment has recently been equipped with Bushmaster Protected Mobility Vehicles (PMV), having previously used 4x4 Land Rover patrol vehicles as part of the conversion to a Light Cavalry (Reconnaissance) role. The last of the previously equipped armoured vehicles, the M113A1 APC was handed over in 2006.

The Regimental Band of the 1st/15th Royal New South Wales Lancers is one of the few Army regimental bands still in existence.  The Band was formed in 1891 and has served with the regiment since, making it the oldest military band in Australia. The Lancer Band consists of Army Musicians who perform for Regimental functions, at public events, and for other Army Ceremonial tasks.

Battle honours
Boer War: South Africa 1899–1902
First World War: Anzac, Defence of Anzac, Suvla, Sari Bair, Gallipoli 1915, Rumani, Magdhaba-Rafah, Egypt 1915–17, Gaza-Beersheba, El Mughar, Nebi Samwil, Jerusalem, Jaffa, Jericho, Jordan (Es Salt), Jordan (Amman), Megiddo, Nablus, Palestine 1917–18
Second World War: South West Pacific 1943–45, Finchaffen, Sattleberg, Wareo, Liberation of Australian New Guinea, Wareo-Lakona, Gusika-Fortification Point, Borneo, Balikpapan, Milford Highway.
The 1st/15th Royal New South Wales Lancers are the most highly decorated unit in the Australian Army with 21 battle honours.

Current organisation

The regiment is currently located as follows:
Regimental Headquarters — Lancer Barracks, Parramatta
The Lancer Band — Lancer Barracks, Parramatta
A Squadron (Dismounted) — Holsworthy Barracks, Moorebank
B Squadron (PMV mounted & Dismounted) — HMAS Harman, Canberra
C Squadron (PMV mounted) — Holsworthy Barracks, Moorebank

Lancers' Museum 
The regimental museum was started in 1957, and is currently hosted at its own building in Linden House, Parramatta. Its collection includes equipment, uniforms, weapons and vehicles used by the Lancers along its history.

The vehicles on display include:
 Covenanter bridgelayer tank
 Matilda close support tank (with 3 inch howitzer)
 Bren Gun carrier
 Staghound armoured car
 Ferret Mk1 and Mk2 scout cars
 Centurion main battle tank
 Daimler Dingo scout car
 Land Rover 4x4 truck with 106mm recoilless gun
 Austin Champ 4x4 truck

Alliances
 – 1st The Queen's Dragoon Guards
 – The Light Dragoons

Gallery

Notes

References
 Website of the Royal New South Wales Lancers Lancer Barracks and Museum
 www.australian-armour.com

External links 

 

Armoured and cavalry regiments of the Australian Army
Military units and formations established in 1885
1885 establishments in Australia